Early Violence is the debut compilation album by American rock band Psychic Ills. It was released on December 5, 2006, by the Social Registry. It is a compilation of Psychic Ills' first two releases Mental Violence I (2003) and Mental Violence II: Diamond City (2005).

Track listing

References

2006 compilation albums
Psychic Ills albums
The Social Registry albums